Persatuan Sepakbola Indonesia Balikpapan, commonly known as Persiba Balikpapan, is an professional football club based in Balikpapan, East Kalimantan, Indonesia. The club plays in Liga 2, after relegation from Liga 1 in 2017 season.

The club is nicknamed Beruang Madu (The Sun Bear), taken from the city mascot of Balikpapan. Founded in 1950 and the club play their home games at the Batakan Stadium, which has a capacity of 40,000. In media, the tautology is often used and to distinguish the club with another club with the same acronym, Persiba Bantul. Another nickname given is Selicin Minyak (slippery as oil) because Balikpapan is the center for oil and gas industry of Indonesia.

Persiba play in all-blue kits at home matches. They rivals are Borneo an Mitra Kukar, two clubs also based in the East Kalimantan province.

History

Early years
The club dubbed Tim Selicin Minyak, was founded in 1950, precisely on 3 August 1950. Since 1950 this club has competed in various tournaments, provincial and national levels. Before becoming the name of Persiba Balikpapan, initial name of the club pride of the city of Balikpapan was PS Belalang before changing its name to Persiba Balikpapan in 1963.

1980s: Golden era
The 80s was indeed the golden age of Persiba. This club runs nonstop. The Third Division title in 1983 was just the beginning. Persiba competed with the host Persisam Samarinda seized the top position. In the last match, the East Kalimantan capital team needed a 7–0 victory to finish first. That number is almost fulfilled. Luckily for Persiba, the PSTK Tarakan prevented one additional goal needed. The match ended 6–0. Persiba stays on top.

The status of the Third Division champions gave Persiba a ticket to the central regional round. Persipal Palu and Persigo Gorontalo act as hosts. But the status of the visitors did not make Persiba monthly. In fact, the hosts are brushed in turns. Each defeated Persiba 1–0. Persiba also ensured the Second Division trophy in 1984 and was entitled to advance to First Division in Yogyakarta.

Persiba once again drove nonstop. The team nicknamed the Selicin Minyak passed round by round until they got a ticket to the top party at Diponegoro Stadium, Semarang on Wednesday, 4 December 1985. The opponent who waited was PSIM Yogyakarta. In his time, this team was quite respected.

However, the legend of Persiba, Junaedi, managed to score the only goal in the match. The action in the 72nd minute determines the victory for the visitors. 1–0 score lasted until the fight was over. Persiba ordained himself as the winner of First Division. Johny Rinning was chosen as the best player. This individual title perfects the golden season of the legend of Persiba. From his position as a libero, Rinning won the four best player titles at once. Starting the best Piala Bupati Gorontalo player 1984, First Division 1985, Surabaya Cup 1985, and East Kalimantan Governor award.

Persiba also began the journey to the First Division, the highest stage of domestic football. It was marked by the establishment of the Persiba Stadium in the era of general chairman Syarifuddin Yoes who was also the Mayor of Balikpapan. This building took place on Parikesit Street, on land owned by PT Pertamina. Its construction was accelerated for a year, pursuing stadium requirements for participants in the Perserikatan Premier Division.

In the highest caste, Persiba is not without achievements. A number of results show this team from East Kalimantan can talk a lot. The Sun Bear team  recorded twice through the last six. Namely in 1987–88 and 1989–90 seasons.

Liga Indonesia era
Since the 1994–95 season, Indonesian football competitions, namely the Perserikatan and Galatama, were merged into one and became the Liga Indonesia Premier Division. In this era, Persiba had to fight hard to stay in the top level of the Indonesian football league. In the first three seasons of the Premier Division, Persiba were always at the bottom of the board and always finished the season one or two positions above the relegation zone in the standings board. And in the 1998–99 season, Persiba was finally relegated to Liga Indonesia First Division after finishing the season ranked 6th (last) East Division.

Zainal Abidin acted as chairman of Persiba at the time. It takes four times a change of leaders until Persiba can return to promotion, in the Syahril era HM Taher starting in 2003. And in the 2004 season, Persiba finally returned to promotion to the Premier Division after finishing in position 4 regional 2 First Division.

In the 2005 season, the first season after Persiba returned to the top level, Persiba immediately showed hope in the Premier Division. Played 26 times and collected 41 points, making Persiba ranked 5 in the East Division, two points adrift and is one level below Persebaya Surabaya who qualified for the second round. And in the 2006 season, Persiba managed to penetrate the second round after being ranked 4th East Division under Persmin Minahasa, Persik Kediri, and PSM Makassar.

ISL era
In the era of the Indonesia Super League (ISL), Persiba achievements in the Indonesian soccer arena can be said scene were practically up and down. In the first season of ISL, Persiba under the care of Daniel Roekito only managed to finish the season in 12th position by collecting 45 points. However, Persiba managed to surprise him by appearing impressive the following season.

In the 2009–10 season with a number of star players like I Made Wirawan, Mijo Dadic, Robertino Pugliara, Gendut Doni and Julio Lopez, the team successfully finished 3rd under Arema Indonesia and Persipura Jayapura, and that position better than Persib Bandung and Persija Jakarta. While two other East Kalimantan representatives, Bontang FC and Persisam Putra Samarinda, stated that they were outside the top 10. In this season too, Persiba managed to "slightly tarnish" the Arema  title.

Because Persiba was able to beat the Singo Edan team at that time in two meetings in that season, both at home and away. And also Persiba became the only team that managed to pick 3 points at the Kanjuruhan Stadium (Arema's stadium) at the time. In this season Persiba also managed to beat several big teams.

At Inter Island Cup (the pre-season tournament for the strong team at the time), Persiba was the only team from Kalimantan who always participated in the tournament. In the 2010 Inter Island Cup, Persiba, the only representative of the island of Kalimantan, once again managed to surprise by defeating the defending champions Piala Indonesia at the time, Sriwijaya with a landslide score and at the tournament also Persiba managed to advance to the semi-finals. These achievements led to predictions that the power of Persiba is believed to be more intense in the future. But after that season, the performance of Persiba has never been as good as that and always up and down.

2017: Financial problems and fall to Liga 2
Since then, the performance of Persiba has fluctuated. Until the 60th season of Indonesian football under the PSSI, or the inaugural edition of the Liga 1 era, the fall of Persiba was truly unavoidable. The oldest team in East Kalimantan has difficulty getting a sponsor. Funding is very dependent on club owners. The status of the team of travelers also makes things difficult.

The location of the Persiba Stadium entered the development agenda of Pertamina as the land owner. The replacement venue for the representative Batakan Stadium is still under construction. Practically, Persiba must ride another cage. Gajayana Stadium was chosen in Malang, East Java.

Gajayana did not side with his new host. Persiba did not even win at home and returned to Parikesit after four matches, before settling at the Batakan Stadium. The performance of the Sun Bear is already bad. Only seven wins from 34 matches. Persiba finished second bottom. Stuck in the red zone with Semen Padang and Persegres Gresik United at the bottom of the standings.

Since then, conditions have not improved. In fact, it almost ended in tragedy. Wanderley Junior's head coach retreated in the middle of the season. The first year in Liga 2, Persiba was one of the candidates degraded. The Honey Bear is finally just one point away from the relegation zone of the Liga 2 East Region.

November 2018, Syahril HM Taher releases the position of chairman of Persiba. Removing hundreds of billions of club debt and leaving Rp 5 billion in shares to be redeemed by new investors. Persiba back to Balikpapan City Government. Only a few days, the new owner of Persiba was answered. None other than Balikpapan Deputy Mayor, Rahmad Mas'ud. Rahmad emphasized his target to bring Persiba back to his habitat in the highest caste.

But, not yet the season began, Rahmad decided to resign. Persiba returned to Balikpapan City Government. It was mentioned because of the complicated process of moving to new management. Balikpapan Mayor Rizal Effendi had asked Masud to abandon his intention. Liga 2 competition is only a matter of months. But the request was never fulfilled.

2019: New era with Gede Widiade
Balikpapan public finally heaved a sigh of relief after their favorite team got a new investor. The name that comes is not a stranger in football. Even has an impressive reputation. It was none other than former Managing Director of Persija Jakarta, Gede Widiade. Certainty is known after the meeting between Rizal Effendi, Syahril HM Taher, and Gede Widiade, on Monday, 29 April 2019.

Gede, no doubt is a perfected person about football. Many clubs have been managed by Gede, even long before bringing Persija to win the 2018 Indonesia President's Cup trophy and the Liga 1 season 2018.

Gede's maneuver took Persiba in surprise. After being released from Persija, his name was associated with the management of the legendary club Sriwijaya who also went down to League 2. However, Gede had his own reasons if he finally chose the Honey Bear. This is inseparable from the role of Syahril as a former chairman. "I am grateful, the Mayor and my parents, Mr. Syahril. I am not here as an investor. But, as his son, Mr. Syahril," Gede told the media after a meeting with the Mayor. The mission to save Persiba begins. League 2 is scheduled for kickoff on 15 June 2019. It takes less than two months to prepare the team. However, Gede is optimistic about being able to complete the mission. Bringing Persiba back to the highest caste, without having to go through four changes to the chairman. "I was asked to help bring Persiba to the right place. God willing, I can carry out the mandate," he added.

Club rivalries

Derby Kaltim (until 2014)
The match of Persiba Balikpapan against one of the clubs from Samarinda, Persisam Putra Samarinda (now Bali United) is called "Derby Kaltim". This match was even said to be the hottest and most violent derby in Kalimantan island.

Told, the beginning of the story of conflict and hostility between two teams from East Kalimantan. As if he didn't want to lose to the derby on the island of Java, the rivalry between the two teams turned out to have happened for decades.

Historical witness who is also the chairman of the match committee (Panpel) Persiba at Gojek Traveloka Liga 1 2017, Warsito said, the hostilities of the two teams have occurred since the 1970s. He said that the rivalry between the two began precisely between players. "If we flashback this dispute since the era of the 1970s, we are like this. So that year it was crowded here but it was only between players when competing, "said Warsito. "At that time it did not extend to the audience, still between players. Because there was no audience yet. Then just spread to supporters, because of fanaticism, "he explained again. According to him, as time went on, then the fighting and hostility intensified, not only in the stadium but also outside the stadium. At that time, there was no good faith from both sides to make a peaceful pledge.

This derby had been suspended after 2015, Putra Samarinda was renamed Bali United and moved home base from Samarinda to Gianyar.

Derby Kaltim (continued)
This is continuation of the previous Derby Kaltim which brought together Persiba Balikpapan and Persisam Putra Samarinda. In this derby there was a match between Persiba Balikpapan and a club from Samarinda as well, namely Pusamania Borneo (now Borneo FC).

When 2015 Putra Samarinda changed its name to Bali United and moved its home base, in the same year, Borneo FC was promoted to Indonesia Super League after winning the Liga Indonesia Premier Division a year earlier.

Rivalry with Mitra Kukar
Mitra Kukar is also one of the rival of Persiba Balikpapan.

Stadium

Persiba Stadium (1986–2017)

This stadium also commonly called Parikesit Stadium. The stadium began construction in 1985 and was completed later. The stadium was built as a requirement for a team that played in the highest competition of Indonesian football (at that time the Peserikatan) must have a stadium with a capacity.
It is currently used mostly for football matches and is used as the home stadium for Persiba Balikpapan. The stadium has a capacity of 12,500 people after the 2008 renovation.

At the start of the season until the middle of the 2017 Liga 1, Persiba is forced to use the Gajayana Stadium in Malang as their home ground because their actual ground, Pertamina's owned by state-owned oil company, was going to be demolished to make way for their oil expansion refinery as their newly built replacement, Batakan Stadium, was still under construction and won't be ready until June. However, Pertamina allows Persiba to return to using Persiba Stadium for one month, from June 1 to 30. After the round of negotiations, Persiba extended this permit and continued to use Parikesit until Batakan was ready and passed verification.

On 22 August 2017, Persiba made his last match at this stadium when against PS TNI, at that time Persiba won dramatically with a score of 1–0 through Anmar Almubaraki's header in the last minute of the match.

Now the stadium which has been accompanying Persiba for decades in national football has been officially taken over by PT Pertamina as the owner of the asset.

Batakan Stadium (2017–present)

The stadium was just completed in August 2017, has a capacity of 40,000. The stadium is predicted to be similar to the Emirates Stadium, home to the English club, Arsenal.

The stadium was first used by Persiba on 9 September 2017, in the continued Liga 1 2017. At that time Persiba competed against Persegres Gresik United, and in the match, Persiba managed to win 3–0.

Players

Current squad

Coaching staff

Current technical staff 
As 17 March 2020

Former coaches

Sponsorship
 Indika Energy
 Pancoran Soccer Field
 SpringHill Group
 GW Apparel
 Physio Optimal
 LOKÉT
 Karbitan

Kit suppliers and shirt sponsors 
Since 2020, the official Persiba Balikpapan kit has been manufactured by GW Apparel.

Notable players 

 Local
  Ponaryo Astaman (1997–1999)
  Bima Sakti (2004–05), (2015–16)
  Talaohu Musafri (2006–2009)
  I Made Wirawan (2006–2012)
  Sultan Samma (2006–2012)
  Johan Yoga Utama (2009–10), (2012–13)
  Gendut Doni Christiawan (2009–2010)
  Hendro Siswanto (2009–2010)
  Eddy Gunawan (2009–2011, 2020–)
  Dwi Joko (2009–2011)
  Galih Sudaryono (2010–2011)
  Asri Akbar (2010–2012)
  Absor Fauzi (2010–2017)
  Dhika Bayangkara (2012–2013)
  Syakir Sulaiman (2012–2013)
  Wawan Hendrawan (2012–2014)
  Rendy Siregar (2013–2014)
  Fengky Turnando (2013–)
  Bryan Cesar (2015–)
  Oktovianus Maniani (2016, 2020–)
  Syamsir Alam (2016)
  Geri Mandagi (2016)
  Abdul Abanda Rachman (2016–2017)
  Kurniawan Ajie (2016–2017)

  Hanif Sjahbandi (2016–2017)
  Heri Susanto (2016–2017)
  Alfath Fathier (2017)
  Bijahil Chalwa (2017)
  Sunarto (2017)

 Asia
  Robert Gaspar (2006–2009)
  Ryan Townsend (2007–2008)
  Anmar Almubaraki (2017)
  Shohei Matsunaga (2011–12), (2016)
  Kenji Adachihara (2011–2012)
  Masahito Noto (2017)
  Park Jung-hwan (2009–10)
  Kim Yong-hee (2010–2011)
  Kim Young-kwang (2013–2014)
  Mahmoud El Ali (2013)
  Mostafa El Qasaa (2013)
  Jason de Jong (2011)
  Khairul Amri (2010–2011)
  Precious Emuejeraye (2012–2013)
  Miro Baldo Bento (2007)

 Africa
  Patrice Nzekou (2012–13), (2014)
  Franck Bezi (2012–2014)

  Boakay Eddie Foday (2016)
  Ansu Toure (2014–2015)
  Dirkir Glay (2016–2017)
  Pape N'Diaye (2014)
  Brima Pepito (2008–2009)

 America
  Adrian Trinidad (2006–07), (2009–10)
  Gaston Castaño (2008–2009)
  Robertino Pugliara (2009–2011)
  Fernando Soler (2013–2014)
  Bruno Zandonaide (2008–2009)
  Elisangello de Jesus Jardim
  Marlon da Silva (2017)
  Julio Lopez (2009–2010)
  Javier Roca (2007–2008)
  Aldo Baretto (2010–2012)
  Esteban Guillén (2012–2013)
  Bryan Aldave (2014–2015)

 Europe
  Mijo Dadić (2008–2011)
  Tomislav Labudović (2012–2013)
  Luka Savić (2012–2013)
  Roman Golian (2015–2016)
  Srđan Lopičić (2017)

Past seasons

Key
 Tms. = Number of teams
 Pos. = Position in league

Honours

Domestic competitions
 Indonesia Super League
 Third place (1) : 2009–10
 Division I
 Winners (1) : 1985
 Division II
 Winners (1) : 1984
 Division III
 Winners (1) : 1983

Others
 Piala Walikota Padang
 Runners-up (1) : 2015
 Trofeo Battle of Borneo
 Winners (1) : 2018

Asian clubs ranking

See also
 List of football clubs in Indonesia

References

External links
 

 
Football clubs in Indonesia
Football clubs in East Kalimantan
Association football clubs established in 1950
1950 establishments in Indonesia